Brodskyella holzschuhi is a beetle in the genus Brodskyella of the family Mordellidae. It was described in 1989 by Horák.

References

Mordellidae
Beetles described in 1989